Ruslan Vitryanyuk (Russian: Руслан Владимирович Витрянюк), born February 28, 1973, is a producer, film maker, actor, Member of Russian Guild of Producers, Member of Ukrainian Guild of Producers.

He is the founder and president of Los Angeles-based Golden Bridge Entertainment and Russian foundation "Stars of the Motherland" (Foundation that supports Culture, Arts, Science and Sports). Ruslan is also the creator and producer of Russian Film Festival in Valence. Ruslan is best known for his works with Pierre Richard, Annie Girardot, Orlando Bloom, Djimon Hounsou, Catherine Deneuve, and Thomas Anders

Education
Ruslan holds his Bachelor's degree in Psychology, Master's degree in Marketing and Advertising. He also has Ph.D degree.

Career
Ruslan started his career as an executive in "Photo" magazine. During his work at "Photo" magazine he got introduced to Stas Namin who had a great photo collection of his own. Ruslan proposed to organize photo exhibition for Stas that turn out to be a great success. Impressed by Ruslan's organizational skills, Stas Namin, who gained a cult figure status as one of the founders of indigenous Russian rock music, offered Ruslan his first job as producer. Ruslan gained tremendous experience working with Stas on numerous projects in The Stas Namin Centre.

In 1998 Ruslan founded "Stars of the Motherland" foundation that supports culture, arts, science and sports. This organization produced numerous gala events in partnership with JSA for various international pop music stars in the Kremlin, Red Square, and Carnegie Hall.

In 1998 Ruslan met Sergey Kalvarskiy, TEFI award winner in "Producer of the Year" nomination (Equivalent to a Golden Globe Award). Starting in 2003 they worked with all major Russian pop and rock stars producing their music videos. 
Ruslan founded "Production Promotion Pictures", his first production company, in 2003 and produced two films the same year. His first work with famous Russian movie director Ivan Solovov, Slova i muzyka was critically acclaimed. His second work was his first TV series project, Nadezhda ukhodit posledney was purchased by one of the most popular Russian channels CTC.

In the period of time between 2005 and 2011 Ruslan partnered with Kinoprom, Top Line Production, and A-1 Kino Video. He produced the following films and TV series "Polnyy vperyod!", Parni iz stali, "Karusel", "Stealing Tarantino",  "Ya dozhdus", Countdown, "Mechtat ne vredno", "Kod apokalipsisa", Zabava, "My iz budushchego 2",Dyuymovochka, "Horror Which Is Always with You", and many others.

In 2011 Ruslan moved to Los Angeles, CA and founded "Golden Bridge Entertainment"

Notable Works with Stas Namin
 1997 -  The World International Festival on the Red Square (concert) and Teatralnaya Square (carnival)in Moscow timed for the city's 850th Anniversary celebrations, featuring ethnic groups from Japan, Scotland, Brazil, India, Britain, Israel, the Palestinian Autonomy, Bulgaria and other countries
 1997 - Michael Legrand concert in Moscow
 1997 - Chuck Berry concert in Moscow
 1998 - "Rhythm'n'Blues Cafe" club and restaurant.
 1999 - Organization of 200 anniversary of Pushkin's birthday in Carnegie Hall
 1999 - Musical "Hair"
 2001 - A 30-year Jubilee of the Stas Namin Group "The Flowers" at the Central Concert Hall "Russia".

Main Achievements
 1995 - Ruslan Vitryanyuk opens company "Russian Stars"
 1998 - Organization of the Foundation "Stars of the Motherland" (The Foundation of Support of Culture, Arts, Science and Sports). Currently Ruslan is the President of the Foundation
 2000 - Organization of the project "Park of the Stars". It was the project where 2000 famous people planted trees with their names. Awards for this project: Festival "Stylish Things", Awarded "Best Project of the year" for the Project "Park of the Stars"; Magazine "Faces. Idols of Russia", Award "Producer of the Year" for "Park of the Stars"; Russian National Olympus, Award for the Achievements in Culture, Arts, Science, and Sports for "Park of the Stars"
 2000 - Ruslan is a producer and the author of original idea of the project "Stars which never dim"
 2001 - Ruslan was a judge for "Ovation", a Russian National Music Award in the field of entertainment and popular music, Ovation Award
 2002 - Judge for "Pearls of Russia" under UNESCO, Beauty pageant.
 2003 - Member of judges in TEFI (Award of Russian Academy of Television).
 2003 - Ruslan Vitryanyuk starts working with the TV producer Sergey Kalvarskiy, academician of the Russian TV Academy, nominee for "Producer of the Year", and a TEFI award winner (Equivalent to America's Golden Globes). Together they worked on more than 20 music videos for the most famous Russian singers.
 2003 - Ruslan Vitryanyuk opens the company "Production Promotion Pictures"
 2004 - Ruslan Vitryanyuk begins work as a producer with the company "Top Line Production". Together they produced many famous and high-budget films.
 2004 -  Ruslan Vitryanyuk begins work as a producer with the company "Kinoprom"
 2005 - Ruslan was a judge for Russian Festival "Astra" of Fashion and Style
 2005 to Present Time - Producer and organizer of Russian Fashion Week. Ruslan created and launched the First Face Model Awards inside Fashion Week (2005–2010). Djimon Hounsou was an honored guest for Russian Fashion Week in 2008.
 2006 - Festival de Cannes, Premiere, Opening Night, film "20 nights and one rainy day", http://www.festival-cannes.fr/
 2006 - Organization of Festival of Russian Cinema in Valence. General producer and president of judges. 
 2006 - Festival of Russian Cinema in France, Premiere "Parisians", Opening night
 2007 - Festival of Alla Surikova in Astrakhan "Smile, Russia".  Awards for the film "Parisians": "Best Director" and "Bright Acting Ensemble" Улыбнись, Россия!
 2007 - Ruslan Vitryanyuk was included in the list of notable people in Russia ("Who is Who" in Russia)
 2007 - Ruslan Vitryanyuk continues work with Sergey Kalvarskiy. Together they work on the project "Minute of Glory" (Минута славы). "Minute of Glory" is the Russian version of "America's Got Talent" and "Britain's Got Talent"
 2008 - Ruslan was awarded with the Order of the 1st Degree from Moscow Government for "The Achievements and Investments in Culture and Arts"
 2008 - Organization of the 60th anniversary of Land Rover at Red Square and The Kremlin  in Moscow. Ruslan was awarded with special a Diploma for "Achievements in Culture and Arts". Orlando Bloom was an honored guest at this anniversary.
 2008 - Judge for "Miss Lubercu 2008", Beauty pageant.

Filmography

References

External links
 

1973 births
Living people
Russian film directors